"Mambo" is a 1938 danzón nuevo ritmo by Arcaño y sus Maravillas. It was composed by the band's cellist/multi-instrumentalist Orestes López. The piece includes a final section with syncopated montunos which would give rise to the mambo music genre popularized by Dámaso Pérez Prado and others.

Personnel 
Antonio Arcaño (replaced by Eulogio Ortiz on 1951 recording) – flute
Jesús López – piano
Israel "Cachao" López – double bass
Orestes López – cello
Miguel Valdés – viola
Enrique Jorrín – violin
Elio Valdés – violin
Fausto Muñoz – violin
Félix Reina - violin
Antonio Sánchez "Musiquita" – violin
Ulpiano Díaz – timbales
Eliseo Martínez – tumbadora
Gustavo Tamayo – güiro

References

1938 songs
Mambo